is a national highway of Japan connecting Chūō-ku, Osaka and Nara, with a total length of .

Route description
Length: 
Origin: Chūō-ku, Osaka (originates at junction with Route 25)
Terminus: Nara city (originates at junction with Route 24)
Major cities: Higashiōsaka and Ikoma

Intersects with

Osaka Prefecture
Route 25
Route 26
Route 165
Route 170

Nara Prefecture
Route 168
Route 24

See also

References

National highways in Japan
Roads in Nara Prefecture
Roads in Osaka Prefecture